Euselasiinae is a subfamily of Riodinidae. The species are confined to the Neotropical realm.

Genera
From Funet  
Corrachia Schaus, 1913
Euselasia (Hübner, 1819) a populous genus with many species.
Hades (Westwood, 1851)
Methone (Doubleday, 1847) 
Styx Staudinger, 1875

References

Riodinidae
Butterfly subfamilies